Giallo sera is an Italian television series.

See also
List of Italian television series

Italian television series